KYZQ (88.3 FM) is a southern gospel radio station licensed to Mount Pleasant, Texas, United States. The station is currently owned by South Central Oklahoma Christian Broadcasting, Inc.

The station was taken silent on February 2, 2020, with the licensee citing financial reasons, and resumed operations on January 26, 2021.

History
This station was assigned call sign KPIP on August 6, 2008 and KYZQ on July 5, 2010.

References

External links

Radio stations established in 2008
YZQ
Southern Gospel radio stations in the United States